The Indian Institute of Technology Bombay (IIT Bombay) is a public research university and technical institute in Powai, Mumbai, Maharashtra, India.

IIT Bombay was founded in 1958. In 1961, the Parliament decreed IITs as Institutes of National Importance. A committee formed by the Government of India recommended the establishment of four higher institutes of technology to set the direction for the development of technical education in the country in 1946. Planning began in 1957 and the first batch of 100 students was admitted in 1958. Since its establishment in Powai, the institute has physically expanded to include more than 584 major buildings with a combined area of more than 2.2 square kilometers.

IIT Bombay is considered as one of the foremost engineering and science universities in Asia, and as the most reputed and the most competitive institute in India to get into and has been the first-preferred destination of top rank holders in the science and engineering disciplines. It is known for its 4-year, 5-year & 2-year programmes for which the entrance is through the Joint Entrance Examinations (JEE), Joint Admission Test for Masters (JAM) and Graduate Aptitude Test in Engineering (GATE). Degrees offered in the university include the four-year Bachelor of Technology (B.Tech.), the two- or three-year Master of Technology (M.Tech.), the four-year Bachelor of Science (B.Sc.), the two-year Master of Science (M.Sc.) and the five-year Inter-Disciplinary Dual-Degree Programme (IDDDP) among many others. It also has a comprehensive graduate program offering doctoral degrees in science, technology, engineering and mathematics. It currently has a total of 15 academic departments, 20 additional education centres, a school of excellence and four interdisciplinary programmes including a management programme and industrial design programmes.

History

IIT Bombay was the second Indian Institute of Technology to be established in 1958 with assistance from UNESCO and with funds contributed by the Soviet Union. UNESCO agreed to provide equipment and technical experts mainly from the Soviet Union, while the Government of India accepted the responsibility for all other expenses including the cost of the building project and recurring expenses. While construction was being completed, the first academic session of the Institute opened on 25 July 1958, in its temporary home at the Synthetic and Art Silk Mills Research Association (SASMIRA) building in Worli with 100 students. The following is the present position regarding the assistance received from UNESCO under the UN Expanded Programme of Technical Assistance:
 Equipment costing Rs.57,35,000 has so far been received (USSR—Rs.55,50,000; UK—Rs.1,50,000; USA—Rs.18,000 and Germany—Rs.19,000)
 12 Progressors (10 Russians, 1 American and 1 Yugoslavian) and 3 Russians Translators are working at the Institution.
 For advanced training in USSR, 4 Indian teachers were deputed in 1958 and 6 more teachers was selected.

These students were selected from over 3,400 applicants for admission to the first year undergraduate engineering programmes of Aerospace, Chemical, Civil, Computer, Electrical, Engineering Physics, Energy, Mechanical, Metallurgical Engineering, and MSc Chemistry. One of the main objectives of establishing the institute was to develop facilities for studies in a variety of specialized engineering and technological sciences. The need for establishing adequate facilities for postgraduate studies and research was kept uppermost in mind in the founding years. While the institute was functioning provisionally at Worli, an effort was made to expedite the progress of the building project at its permanent location and Jawaharlal Nehru laid the foundation stone of the Institute at Powai on 10 March 1959.

On July 9, 2018, IIT Bombay was conferred the status of Institute of Eminence by the Ministry of Human Resources & Development, along with 5 other institutes in India which would provide it additional autonomy and government funds.

Campus 

The IIT Bombay campus, having an area of about 545 acres, is located at Powai, in East Mumbai, between the Vihar and Powai lakes. The campus is divided into clusters of buildings. The academic area chiefly comprises the main building, various departmental annexes and auditoria. All department annexes are connected by a corridor named Infinite Corridor. Beyond the Convocation Hall lie most of the hostels. There are a total of 18 hostels, of which two hostels (Hostels 10 and 11) and a wing of the newly constructed hostel (Hostel 15) are for female students.

Due to its proximity to the Sanjay Gandhi National Park, the campus has significant green cover and is mostly untouched by the pollution of the rest of the city. The proximity of the campus to the national park has also led to occasional sightings of leopards and mugger crocodiles along the banks of the Powai lake. Sometimes they stray into the campus in search of prey.

The campus has also recorded over 200 species of birds including Indian grey hornbill, Indian pitta, Vigors's sunbird, Ashy prinia, Indian paradise flycatcher, Rufous woodpecker, Oriental darter.

The institute has two swimming pools; football, hockey and cricket grounds; and tennis, basketball, squash and volleyball courts. It also has a Students' Activity Center (SAC) for various cultural and other extracurricular activities. In addition to these facilities, the campus also houses two high schools, one of which is a Kendriya Vidyalaya and the other is called IIT Campus School.

Organization and administration

Governance 
At the institutional level, IIT Bombay is governed by a Board of Governors with its Chairman nominated by the Visitor (the President of India) guided by the IIT Council; the Director as a member; the Registrar as secretary. Besides this, there are four persons having specialized knowledge or practical experience in respect of education, engineering or science nominated by the council. Two professors are nominated by the Senate. Additionally, one technologist or industrialist of repute is nominated by the Government of each of the States of Maharashtra, Madhya Pradesh and Gujarat.

For all academic matters, the Senate is the authority having control and responsibility for the maintenance of standards of instruction, education and examinations and all other allied academic matters. The Senate is constituted of all the professors of the institute, a few nominated members and the Director, appointed by MHRD for a period of five years, the executive head of the institute is the chairman.

The key people in the execution of the institute's activities are the Director and two deputy directors (Academic & Infrastructural Affairs and Finance & External Affairs) who are assisted by seven Deans (Infrastructure Planning & Support, Research & Development, Academic Programmes, Students Affairs, Alumni & Corporate Relations, Faculty Affairs and International Relations) and the Heads of the Departments, Centres and Schools. The other administrative functions are managed by the Registrar, with senior administrative officers being assigned for specific areas such as Estate Management, Materials Management, Personnel Management, Finance and Accounts, and Academic Affairs.

The Institute Advisory Council is a non-statutory body comprising eminent personalities from business, industry and academia, which reviews and makes suggestions on long-term policies and short-term goals.

Academic Office
The Academic Office of the Institute exists to facilitate, initiate and co-ordinate the academic work of the institute, particularly the teaching and assessment of students. It acts as the repository of grades and academic records of all students, both past and present. It provides administrative support to the Senate, which is the highest academic body of the institute.

The Head of the Academic Office is the Dean of Academic Programmes, who is a senior professor of the institute. The Dean is helped by a permanent administrative set-up headed by a Deputy Registrar (education). Academic Office closely interacts with the Dean of Student Affairs (DoSA), who looks after all non-academic problems of students. The DoSA, as the ex-officio President of the Student Gymkhana, coordinates various co-curricular activities of students.

Departments, Centres, and Schools 

IIT Bombay has 15 departments, 36 multi-disciplinary centres, 3 school of excellence and 4 interdisciplinary programs.

The academic departments in IIT Bombay include the following:

 Aerospace Engineering
 Biosciences and Bioengineering
 Chemical Engineering
 Chemistry
 Civil Engineering
 Computer Science & Engineering
 Earth Sciences
 Electrical Engineering
 Energy Science and Engineering
 Environmental Science and Engineering (ESED)
 Humanities & Social Science
 Mathematics
 Mechanical Engineering
 Metallurgical Engineering & Materials Science
 Physics

The following multi-disciplinary centres are located in IIT Bombay:

Application Software Centre (ASC)
Biomedical Engineering and Technology (Incubation) Centre (BETiC)
Centre for Research in Nanotechnology and Science (CRNTS)
Centre for Aerospace Systems Design and Engineering (CASDE)
Computer Centre (CC)
Centre for Computational Engineering and Science
Centre for Distance Engineering Education Programme (CDEEP)
Centre of Excellence in Nanoelectronics
Centre for Excellence in Steel Technology (CEST)
Centre of Excellence in Oil, Gas and Energy (CoE-OGE)
Ashank Desai Centre for Policy Studies (CPS) 
Centre for Machine Intelligence and Data Science (C-MInDS)
Centre of Studies in Resources Engineering (CSRE)
Centre for Technology Alternatives for Rural Areas (CTARA)
Centre for Formal Design and Verification of Software (CFDVS)
Centre of Propulsion Technology (CoPT)
Centre for Urban Science and Engineering (C-USE)
Centre for Liberal Education (CLE)
Forbes Marshall Energy Efficiency Laboratory
Geospatial Information Science and Engineering
IITB-Monash Research Academy
Koita Centre for Digital Health (KCDH)
National Centre for Aerospace Innovation and Research (NCAIR)
National Centre of Excellence in Carbon Capture and Utilization (NCoE-CCU)
National Center of Excellence in Technology for Internal Security (NCETIS)
National Centre for Mathematics (NCM)
National Centre for Photovoltaic Research and Education (NCPRE)
National Mission on Education Through ICT
National Solar Thermal Research, Testing and Simulation Technology
Parimal and Pramod Chaudhari Centre for Learning and Teaching (PPCCLT)
Sophisticated Analytical Instrument Facility (SAIF)
Tata Centre for Technology and Design (TCTD)
Tata Teleservices - IITB Centre for Excellence in Telecommunication
Technocraft Centre for Applied Artificial Intelligence (TCAAI)
Wadhwani Research Centre for Bioengineering (WRCB)
Water Innovation Centre: Technology, Research and Education
Additional Centre:

IITB-WashU Aerosol and Air Quality Research Center

Schools of excellence in IIT Bombay are:
 Desai Sethi School of Entrepreneurship (DSSE)
 IDC School of Design
 Shailesh J Mehta School of Management

In addition to the above, IIT Bombay also offers Inter-disciplinary programmes:
Climate Studies
Educational Technology
Industrial Engineering and Operations Research (IEOR)
Systems and Control Engineering

Academics

Programmes
IIT Bombay offers a wide range of educational programmes include Physical sciences, Engineering, Designs, Humanities and Social sciences such as Economics, English, Philosophy, Psychology and Sociology and Management studies with a primary focus on engineering. Over the years, the institute has also created a niche for its innovative short-term courses through continuing education and distance education programmes. The university is a member of Links to Asia by Organizing Traineeship and Student Exchange (LAOTSE), an international network of leading universities in Europe and Asia exchanging students and senior scholars.

The institute conducts educational programmes leading to the degree of Bachelor of Technology (B.Tech.), Bachelor of Sciences (B.S.), Dual Degree (B.Tech. and M.Tech. in 5 years), Master of Science (MSc.), Master of Technology (M.Tech.), Bachelor of Design (B.Des.), Master of Design (M.Des.), Master of Business Administration (MBA), formerly Master of Management, Master of Philosophy (M.Phil.) and Doctor of Philosophy (PhD.) in various subject domains.

Every year, IIT Bombay awards degrees, B.Tech., M.Tech., Dual Degree (B.Tech. and M.Tech.), M.Mgmt, MSc and Ph.D. to more than 1,000 students. The undergraduate students at IIT Bombay are selected through the Joint Entrance Examination of the IITs. The graduate students are selected through Joint Admission Test for Masters (JAM) and Graduate Aptitude Test in Engineering (GATE) conducted by IIT's and IISc on behalf of MHRD [Ministry of Human Resource Development]. At a given time, the campus is home to more than 6,000 people: students, professors, and non-academic staffs.

In 2015 the National Virtual Academy for Indian Agriculture launched a free online agriculture course in collaboration with ICRISAT Hyderabad and IIT Bombay. From July 2016, IIT Bombay is planning to offer a four-year undergraduate programme in economics.

In April 2015, IIT Bombay launched the first U.S.-India joint EMBA program alongside Washington University in St. Louis.

Rankings

IIT Bombay has been consistently ranked as the number 1 University in India by the Quacquarelli Symonds (QS) world university ranking. It has ranked on 42nd position among the top 700 Universities in Asia category by the QS Asia Ranking 2022, and ranked on 177th in QS World University Rankings in 2022.

The National Institutional Ranking Framework (NIRF) ranked it third among engineering colleges in 2021 and third overall. NIRF also ranked it tenth in India in the management ranking.

Development activities

Faculty members from IIT Bombay undertake industry-sponsored research and consultancy projects that are made available through the institute. These are funded by various national agencies like the Department of Science and Technology, Department of Electronics, Department of Space, Aeronautical Development Agency, Department of Atomic Energy, and Oil and Natural Gas Commission (ONGC). Many are also working on projects of national importance. A few projects are also being funded by international agencies. Typically in one year, there are about 400 on-going sponsored projects. The sponsored research has ushered in intense research activity leading to the formation of active research groups and has helped in the creation of modern research facilities in key areas.

The office of the Dean (R&D) provides the necessary liaison with industry and sponsoring agencies. The office helps industry to identify faculty expertise and institutional facilities, and assists faculty in identifying industry problems.

There are also a number of central facilities such as the Central Library, Central Workshop, and Printing Press. Many new research facilities have been acquired or developed in the last few years. One of the most important of them is the Computer Centre which started functioning in 1986 with facilities which have been continuously updated. The Computer Aided Design Centre with its own minicomputers and workstations, supplemented by additional computing facilities, caters to CAD activity in Chemical Engineering and Metallurgical Engineering. Research groups like VLSI Design, CAD/CAM also have computing facilities which are accessible to other departments for development activities. Recently, work on developing medical implants has been initiated. The OrthoCAD Network Research Cell was established in 2007 to jump-start indigenous research and development activities in orthopedic reconstruction systems. Important experimental facilities set up by various departments include laboratories for robotics, biotechnology, microelectronics, microprocessor applications, telematics, remote sensing, low-temperature physics, and aerodynamics.
Earlier IIT Bombay announced the online classes for the batch 2020-21 from August 10. A fund raising campaign was launched in order to help the students in need. The batch of 1994 of IIT Bombay donated Rs. 1.25 crores to help the students and provide them with laptops and internet connections which will be helpful for the online classes. The director of IIT Bombay thanked the alumni members for their constant support towards their college.

Student life

Cultural and non-academic activities

The annual Science & Technology festival of IIT Bombay, Techfest, which was started in 1998, is held in the month of December every year and is Asia's largest Science and Technology festival.

The Entrepreneurship Cell of IIT Bombay (also known as E-Cell, IITB), started in 1998, organizes several activities throughout the year in order to promote entrepreneurship. Eureka! is Asia's largest business model competition conducted by E-Cell, IITB and receives participation from more than 12,500 startups. E-Summit is a two-day entrepreneurship conclave organized in the campus of IIT Bombay by E-Cell to bring together all the stakeholders of the entrepreneurship ecosystem.

The annual cultural festival Mood Indigo, usually held in the month of December is an event hosted by the student body and is the Asia's largest college cultural festival. The most attractive feature of this 4-day event are the influential personalities who have graced the festival like R D Burman, Aamir Khan, Sir Mark Tully, Sachin Tendulkar, Porcupine Tree, Simple Plan, Mike Portnoy and many more.

These college festivals are organised, financially managed and conducted entirely by the students of this institute. All these festivals and organisations are sponsored by private enterprise.

Abhyuday, the social body of IIT Bombay also hosts one of its kind two-day social fest started in 2013 to provide a link between the real-life problems faced by the people to the students who wish to bring about a change society. The two-day fest is home to Action Plan - a social entrepreneurship competition, movie screenings, workshops and events on varied social issues. Many eminent personalities and social workers like Sonam Wangchuk, Dia Mirza, Ashish Vidyarthi, Tukaram Munde and such have graced the social fest since its start.

Apart from these festivals, various other engineering streams based festivals are also being organised to motivate students towards Science and Technology. These include Radiance (Mechanical Engineering), Zephyr (Aerospace Engineering), AZeotropy (Chemical Engineering), Padarth(Metallurgy and Material Science Engineering), Aavriti (Electrical Engineering) and recently, Aakaar (Civil Engineering).

The institute has music clubs "Symphony" and "Roots" which pertain to western and Indian music respectively. It also has an LGBT alliance club called "Saathi". The institute has an active NCC unit, the 2 Maharashtra Engineer Regiment which is an attachment of the Bombay Sappers.

IIT Bombay's Diamond Jubilee was held in 2018, with Prime Minister Narendra Modi attending as the chief guest of the convocation function.

Notable alumni and faculty members

 Parag Agrawal (Former CEO of twitter)
 Jairam Ramesh (Member of Rajya Sabha)
 K. Sivan (Former chairman of ISRO)
 Nandan Nilekani (Non - Executive Chairman, Infosys)
 Bhavish Aggarwal (Co-founder of Ola Cabs)
 Raghu Raghuram (CEO, VMware)

See also
 Indian Institutes of Technology 
 List of universities in India
National Institutes of Technology
National Testing Agency
Joint Seat Allocation Authority

References

External links
 

 
Institutes of Eminence
Engineering colleges in Mumbai
Education in Mumbai
Bombay
Educational institutions established in 1958
1958 establishments in Bombay State